The Brutsche Freedom 40 was an American homebuilt aircraft that was designed by Neal H. Brutsche and produced by Brutsche Aircraft Corporation of Salt Lake City, Utah. The aircraft was intended to be supplied in the form of plans for amateur construction, with a partial kit available.

Design and development
The Freedom 40 featured a strut-braced high-wing, a single-seat enclosed cockpit with a door, fixed conventional landing gear and a single engine in tractor configuration.

The aircraft was made from pop rivetted sheet aluminum.

To simplify construction, the design had no complex parts to make and no compound curves to form. In 1998 the plans sold for US$250.00. Completion cost for the airframe alone was estimated at US$3000.00 in 1998.

Operational history
In December 2013 there were no examples registered in the United States with the Federal Aviation Administration and it is unlikely that any exist any more.

Specifications (Freedom 40)

References

External links
Photo of a Freedom 40

Freedom 40
1990s United States sport aircraft
1990s United States ultralight aircraft
Single-engined tractor aircraft
High-wing aircraft
Homebuilt aircraft